The Nyasaland Government Gazette was the government gazette of Nyasaland.

The Gazette was published between October 1907 and 3 July 1964. Copies may be found in the collections of the British Library. It was replaced by the Malawi government gazette when Nyasaland became independent from Britain as Malawi.

See also
List of British colonial gazettes

References

British colonial gazettes
Publications established in 1907
Nyasaland
1964 disestablishments